"Something of a Dreamer" is a song written and recorded by American country music artist Mary Chapin Carpenter.  It was released in June 1990 as the fourth single from the album State of the Heart.  The song reached #14 on the Billboard Hot Country Singles & Tracks chart.

Chart performance

References

1990 singles
Mary Chapin Carpenter songs
Songs written by Mary Chapin Carpenter
Columbia Records singles
1989 songs